Delārām (Pashto/Persian: دلارام) is a city in the northern part of Nimruz Province, in southern Afghanistan. It is a major transportation center, with several major road converging on the area, including Kandahar–Herat Highway (part of the Ring Road), Route 515 to Farah, Route 522 to Gulistan and Route 606 to Iran.  The district center contains a large bazaar.

History
Delaram was initially a city in Khash Rod District in Nimruz Province, but was administratively transferred to Farah Province in 2007 for a short time as a separate district. Delaram transitioned to Farah Province following a period of violence between ISAF and the Taliban, in which the Afghan Border Police were brought in to restore order. Delaram was then transferred back to Nimruz Province and remained a separate district of Nimruz.

Climate
Delaram has a hot desert climate (Köppen BWh), characterised by little precipitation and high variation between summer and winter temperatures. The average temperature in Delaram is 18.9 °C, while the annual precipitation averages 106 mm. July is the hottest month of the year with an average temperature of 31.9 °C. The coldest month January has an average temperature of 6.1 °C.

Delaram US Military Base
Forward Operating Base Delaram, with elements of the ANA 215th Corps and U.S. Marines, was located near the town of Delaram.

Route 606: Delaram-Zaranj Highway

The Delaram–Zaranj Highway, also known as Route 606, is a 217-km or 135-mile-long two-lane road built by India in Afghanistan, connecting Delaram in Farah Province with Zaranj in neighbouring Nimruz Province near the Iranian border. It connects the Afghan–Iranian border with the Kandahar–Herat Highway in Delaram, which provides connectivity to other major Afghan cities via A01, including to India's planned mining operation in Hajigak mining concession. Route 606 reduces travel time between Delaram and Zaranj from the earlier 12–14 hours to just 2 hours. India-Iran signed an agreement in May 2016 to connect it to Port of Chabahar with rail and road links.

References

Farah Province
Populated places in Nimruz Province